The Conservative Anglican Church of North America is an independent Anglo-Catholic denomination founded in 2001 in Katy, Texas. It considers itself evangelical, Catholic and Full Gospel in its theology and practice.

It is not in communion with the Episcopal Church (U.S.A.) or the Church of England. However, it is in full communion with the Church of South India, and embraces and recognizes Christians and ministries in other branches of Christianity as valid expressions of God's Spirit at work in the world.

Although the denomination does not ordain women as priests or bishops, women do serve in the capacity of deaconess. 
The Conservative Anglican Church of North America recognizes the value of the ministry of women and fully supports their work as essential to the furtherance of the work of the Gospel.

External links
Conservative Anglican Church of North America
Conservative Anglican Church of North America, Presiding Bishop's Website

Anglo-Catholicism
Anglican denominations in North America